Glengarry was an electoral riding in Ontario, Canada. It was created in 1867 at the time of confederation and was abolished in 1973 before the 1975 election. The riding roughly corresponded to the territory of Glengarry County.

In the electoral redistribution of 1975, Glengarry was merged into Stormont—Dundas and Glengarry.

There was a Glengarry district used to elect a member of the Legislative Assembly of Upper Canada previous to Confederation, starting in 1792.

Members of Provincial Parliament

References

Former provincial electoral districts of Ontario